This is a list of the gymnasts who represented their country at the 2000 Summer Olympics in Sydney from 15 September to 1 October 2000. Gymnasts across three disciplines (artistic gymnastics, rhythmic gymnastics, and trampoline) participated in the Games.

Women's artistic gymnastics 

China entered Dong Fangxiao into the 2000 Olympics under a birth date of 20 January 1983, which would have made her 17. However, when she obtained accreditation to work as a technical official at the Beijing Olympics eight years later, she gave her birth date as 23 January 1986, which would have made her 14 and too young to compete. In 2010, the International Gymnastics Federation concluded that Dong had been born in 1986 and revoked the bronze medal she won with the Chinese team in Sydney.

Men's artistic gymnastics

Rhythmic gymnasts

Individual

Group

Male trampoline gymnasts

Female trampoline gymnasts

References 

Gymnastics at the 2000 Summer Olympics
Gymnastics-related lists